Lakes in the North Rhine-Westphalia state of Germany are: